Pozo may refer to:

People
 Alejandro Pozo (born 1999), Spanish footballer
 Angelica Pozo, American clay artist
 Arnulfo Pozo (born 1945), Ecuadorian cyclist
 Arquimedez Pozo (born 1973), Dominican baseball player
 Chano Pozo (1915–1948), Cuban jazz musician
 Chino Pozo (1915–1980), Cuban drummer
 Diego Pozo (born 1978), Argentine footballer
 Hipólito Pozo (born 1941), Ecuadorian cyclist
 Iván Pozo (born 1978), Spanish boxer
 José Ángel Pozo (born 1996), Spanish footballer
 Juan Carlos Pozo (born 1981), Spanish footballer
 Luz Pozo Garza (1922-2020), Spanish poet
 Mauricio Pozo (disambiguation)
 Octavio Pozo (born 1983), Chilean footballer
 Pablo Pozo (born 1973), Chilean football referee
 Pedro Pozo (fl. 1810), Spanish painter
 Rubén Pozo (born 1975), Spanish musician
 Yohel Pozo (born 1997), Venezuelan baseball player

Places
 Pozo, California, an unincorporated community in San Luis Obispo County
 Pozo Izquierdo, a small town on the island of Gran Canaria
 El Pozo, Sinaloa, Mexico
 El Pozo railway station, Madrid, Spain

Other uses
 Craugastor pozo, a frog of family Craugastoridae
 Pozo language

See also